The 1956 United States Senate election in South Dakota took place on November 6, 1956. Incumbent Republican Senator Francis H. Case ran for re-election to a second term. In the general election, Case was opposed by former State Representative Kenneth Holum, who was the 1954 Democratic nominee for the U.S. Senate. Owing in part to anger among the state's farmers, the race between Case and Holum was quite close, with Holum leading Case on election night and only falling behind the next day. Case ended up narrowly winning re-election, defeating Holum by just 4,620 votes.

Democratic Primary

Candidates
 Kenneth Holum, former State Representative, 1954 Democratic nominee for the U.S. Senate
 Merton B. Time, Mitchell municipal judge, attorney

Results

Republican Primary
Incumbent U.S. Senator Francis H. Case was the only Republican candidate to file for the U.S. Senate, removing the race from the primary ballot.

General election

Results

References

South Dakota
1956
1956 South Dakota elections